James Edwin Wallace Thompson (April 29, 1879 – March 6, 1958) was a Canadian politician. He served in the Legislative Assembly of British Columbia from 1916 to 1920 from the electoral district of Grand Forks, a member of the Liberal party.

References

1879 births
1958 deaths
British Columbia Liberal Party MLAs